The Gerard Salton Award is presented by the Association for Computing Machinery (ACM) Special Interest Group on Information Retrieval (SIGIR) every three years to an individual who has made "significant, sustained and continuing contributions to research in information retrieval". SIGIR also co-sponsors (with SIGWEB) the Vannevar Bush Award, for the best paper at the Joint Conference on Digital Libraries.

Chronological honorees and lectures
Source: SIGIR
 1983 — Gerard Salton, Cornell University : "About the future of automatic information retrieval."
 1988 — Karen Spärck Jones, University of Cambridge : "A look back and a look forward."
 1991 — Cyril Cleverdon, Cranfield Institute of Technology : "The significance of the Cranfield tests on index languages."
 1994 — William S. Cooper, University of California, Berkeley : "The formalism of probability theory in IR: a foundation or an encumbrance?"
 1997 — , Rutgers University : "Users lost (summary): reflections on the past, future, and limits of information science." 
 2000 — Stephen E. Robertson, City University London : "On theoretical argument in information retrieval."For ... "Thirty years of significant, sustained and continuing contributions to research in information retrieval. Of special importance are the theoretical and empirical contributions to the development, refinement, and evaluation of probabilistic models of information retrieval."
 2003 — W. Bruce Croft, University of Massachusetts Amherst : "Information retrieval and computer science: an evolving relationship."For ... "More than twenty years of significant, sustained and continuing contributions to research in information retrieval. His contributions to the theoretical development and practical use of Bayesian inference networks and language modelling for retrieval, and to their evaluation through extensive experiment and application, are particularly important. The Center for Intelligent Information Retrieval which he founded illustrates the strong synergies between fundamental research and its application to a wide range of practical information management problems."
 2006 — C. J. van Rijsbergen, University of Glasgow : 	"Quantum haystacks."
 2009 — Susan Dumais, Microsoft Research : "An Interdisciplinary Perspective on Information Retrieval."
 2012 — Norbert Fuhr, University of Duisburg-Essen: "Information Retrieval as Engineering Science."
 2015 — Nicholas J. Belkin, Rutgers University : “People, Interacting with Information”
 2018 — , University of Tampere : “Information Interaction in Context”
 2021 — ChengXiang Zhai, University of Illinois Urbana–Champaign : “Information Retrieval as Augmentation of Human Intelligence”

See also
 Information Retrieval Awards
 List of computer science awards

References

External links
 ACM SIGIR homepage
 ACM SIGIR awards

Association for Computing Machinery
Computer science awards